2008 in television may refer to:
 2008 in American television for television related events in the United States.
 2008 in Australian television for television related events in Australia.
 2008 in Belgian television for television related events in Belgium.
 2008 in Brazilian television for television related events in Brazil.
 2008 in British television for television related events in Great Britain.
 2008 in Scottish television for television related events in Scotland.
 2008 in Canadian television for television related events in Canada.
 2008 in Croatian television for television related events in Croatia.
 2008 in Danish television for television related events in Denmark.
 2008 in Dutch television for television related events in the Netherlands.
 2008 in Estonian television for television related events in Estonia.
 2008 in French television for television related events in France.
 2008 in German television for television related events in Germany.
 2008 in Irish television for television related events in Ireland.
 2008 in Italian television for television related events in Italy.
 2008 in Japanese television for television related events in Japan.
 2008 in New Zealand television for television related events in New Zealand.
 2008 in Norwegian television for television related events in Norway.
 2008 in Pakistani television for television related events in Pakistan.
 2008 in Philippine television for television related events in the Philippines.
 2008 in Polish television for television related events in Poland.
 2008 in Portuguese television for television related events in Portugal.
 2008 in South African television for television related events in South Africa.
 2008 in Spanish television for television related events in Spain.
 2008 in Swedish television for television related events in Sweden.

 
Mass media timelines by year